"Wanted" is a 1979 song by English pop group The Dooleys. It was recorded in 1979 and reached No.3 in both the UK and Irish charts that summer, becoming the band's highest charting single in both countries. It was written by Findon\Myers\Puzey (who also wrote "I'm In the Mood for Dancing" by The Nolans) and was produced by Ben Findon. The label was GTO. The lead singers on this record were, Kathy Dooley and Anne Dooley.

The song has been re-recorded by Nicki French and Suzanna Dee for Nicki's 2018 album "Glitter to the Neon Lights".

References

1979 singles
1979 songs